Wim Botha (born 1974) is a South African contemporary artist.

Biography

Botha was born in Pretoria in 1974 and currently lives in Cape Town, South Africa. He grew up in a suburban town on the eastern side of Pretoria. In 1996, Botha graduated from the University of Pretoria with a Bachelors in Visual Art. He has received the Helgaard Steyn Prize for sculpture in 2013, Standard Bank Young Artist Award 2005, and the Tollman Award 2003.

Works

Botha has found inspiration for his work in government texts and religious icons, objects that show belief, faith, observation, transgression and forgiveness. Among the mediums he uses are treated wood, books, acrylic enamel paint, oil paint, steel, Indian ink, bronze, paper, and marble.

The artist explains; “My works are a process of distillations...They attempt to reduce all-encompassing ideas and universal factors down to their core idea.” Exploring along the way “intercepting variables” and “patterns”

Exhibitions 

2014
Linear Perspectives - Stevenson, Cape Town

2013
PREDICATES - Galerie Jette Rudolph, Berlin

2012
Wim Botha - Stevenson, Johannesburg

2011
All Around - Galerie Jette Rudolph, Berlin 
Wim Botha - Stevenson, Cape Town

2009
Wim Botha: Joburg Altarpiece & Amazing Things from Other Places - Stevenson, Cape Town

2008
Wim Botha - Galerie Jette Rudolph, Berlin 
Wim Botha - Stevenson, Johannesburg

2007
Wim Botha: Apocalagnosia - Stevenson, Cape Town

2006
Wim Botha: Standard Bank Young Artist for Visual Art 2005 - Standard Bank Gallery,Johannesburg

2005
 A Premonition of War - Durban Art Gallery, Durban
 A Premonition of War. Standard Bank Young - The Nelson Mandela Metropolitan Art Museum, Port Elizabeth
 Cold Fusion. Gods, Heroes and Martyrs - Stevenson, Cape Town
 Standard Bank Young Artist for Visual Art 2005 - South African National Art Gallery,Cape Town
 
2003
Speculum - Stevenson, Cape Town

Group shows

2014
 Artists Engaged? Maybe - Gulbenkian. Próximo Futuro, Lisbon
 Alptraum - Maribor Art Gallery, Maribor
 Alptraum - Maribor Art Gallery, Maribor
 The Divine Comedy. Heaven, hell, purgatory from the perspective of African contemporary artists - -Museum für Moderne Kunst (MMK), Frankfurt/Main

2013
A Sculptural Premise - Stevenson, Cape Town
Pophits & Alptraum - Artspace RheinMain, Offenbach
The Loom of the Land - Stevenson, Johannesburg

2012
 Alptraum - The Nightmare Never Ends - X project space, Berlin
 Alptraum - Green Papaya Art Project - - Metropolitan Museum of Manila, Manila
 Alptraum - Green Papaya Art Projects, Quezon City
 Alptraum - Goethe-Institut Johannesburg, Johannesburg

2011
 Conrad Botes With Berni Searle, Wim Botha, Nandipha Mntambo, Penny Siopis, Serge Alain Nitegeka + Sabelo Mlangeni - Turner Gallery, Perth, WA
 mémoires du futur - la collection Olbricht - La Maison Rouge, Paris
 Göteborg International Biennial for Contemporary Art 2011 - Göteborg International Biennial for Contemporary Art, Gothenburg
 iALPTRAUM! - Blank Projects, Cape Town
 New Acquisitions - The Nelson Mandela Metropolitan Art Museum, Port Elizabeth
 Alptraum! - Anat Egbi, Los Angeles, CA
 ¡ALPTRAUM! - Washington D.C., London, Berlin, Los Angeles, Kapstadt - Projektraum Deutscher Künstlerbund, Berlin

2010
 Index 40: Leading Works from the Sanlam Art Collection - Smac Art Gallery, Stellenbosch
 PEEKABOO - Current South Africa - Helsinki Art Museum, Helsinki
 Triennale Kleinplastik - Larger Than Life - Stranger Than Fiction - Triennale Kleinplastik Fellbach, Fellbach

2009
Self/Not-self - Stevenson, Johannesburg

2008
Disguise: The art of attracting and deflecting attention - Stevenson, Cape Town

2007
 * Politische Ikonografie - Galerie Jette Rudolph, Berlin 
 * Summer 2007/8 - Stevenson, Cape Town
 * Africa Remix - Contemporary art of a continent - Johannesburg Art Gallery (JAG), Johannesburg
 * TRANS CAPE - contemporary African art on the move - Trans Cape Africa, Cape Town
 * Afterlife - Stevenson, Cape Town

2006
 South African Art Now - Stevenson, Cape Town
 Africa Remix - Moderna Museet, Stockholm
 What lies beneath - New Art from South Africa - Galerie Mikael Andersen, Copenhagen
 Africa Remix - Contemporary Art of a Continent - Mori Art Museum, Tokyo
 7ème Biennale de l´Art Africain contemporain - Dak'Art Biennale de l’art africain contemporain,Dakar
 Personal Affects - Power and Poetics in Contemporary South African Art - Honolulu Museum of Art, Honolulu, HI
 Olvida quien soy - Centro Atlántico de Arte Moderno (CAAM), Las Palmas de Gran Canaria

2005
 South African art 1848 - now - Stevenson, Cape Town
 African Remix - l'art contemporain d'un continent - Centre Pompidou - Musée National d´Art Moderne, Paris
 Africa Remix – Contemporary Art of a Continent - Hayward Gallery, London

2004
 Personal Affects - Power and Poetics in Contemporary - Museum for African Art, New York City, NY
 Afrika Remix - Zeitgenössische Kunst eines Kontinents - Museum Kunstpalast, Düsseldorf

2003
 The Ampersand Foundation - Warren Siebrits Gallery, Johannesburg
 Contact Zones - Colonial & Contemporary - Stevenson, Cape Town

Exhibition catalogues

Wim Botha: Rooms 2001-2014 (2014)
Wim Botha: Solipsis I-V (2013)
Wim Botha: Busts 2003-2012 (2012)
Wim Botha: Joburg Altarpiece & Amazing Things from Other Places (PDF only, 2009)
Wim Botha: Apocalagnosia (2007)
Wim Botha: Standard Bank Young Artist (2005)
Wim Botha: Cold Fusion: Gods, heroes and martyrs (2005)
Wim Botha: Speculum (2003)

References

South African sculptors
21st-century sculptors
People from Pretoria
University of Pretoria alumni
1974 births
Living people